The Order of Brothelyngham was a group of men, who, in the late 14th century, formed themselves into a fake religious order in the city of Exeter. They may well have been satirising the church, which by now was commonly perceived as corrupt. Tales of priests and nuns not living according to their vows—indeed, actively breaking them—were common. The group appears to have named themselves after a non-existent place, Brothelygham, a name which would have suggested chaos, wretchedness or some similar context to contemporaries. The faux religious dressed as monks and, supposedly, elected a madman as their abbot, who ruled the men from high, courtesy of a grand theatrical stage.

The Brothelynghamites caused much trouble in Exeter and its environs, regularly emerging from their base—which may have been some form of medieval theatre—and terrorising the local populace. Bearing their 'Abbot' aloft before them, on a mockery of a cathedra, they kidnapped locals whom they held for ransom. They also practiced extortion. It is possible that, notwithstanding these activities, they saw themselves as theatrical players rather than criminals. The Bishop of Exeter, John Grandisson, issued instructions to his agents in nearby Chudleigh to investigate, and if they deemed it necessary, to condemn and excommunicate the order. They clearly expected to find evidence of disobedience and debauchery.

As one of the few such gangs known to modern historians, the Order of Brothelyngham is considered historiographically significant for what it implicitly suggests of anticlerical activities and attitudes in England during the period. The name is generally considered a play on the Order of Sempringham, which was the target of contemporary gossip and rumour on account of its policy of enclosing both monks and nuns on the same premises.

Background
The Order of Brothelyngham is considered by historians to have been a pseudo-religious order created in Exeter in 1348 for the purpose of satirising the clergy. They were treated by both locals and the establishment with no less antipathy for the fact that it was said to have begun life as a non-violent organisation. Such "fool societies", while relatively common in France, were rare in England, argues the scholar E. K. Chambers, and that of Brothelyngham is one of the few known to modern historians. The medievalist, G. G. Coulton, has noted that "medieval buffoons often parodied ecclesiastical titles". Other examples are the Boy Bishop, whereby a young boy—"in a deliberate challenge to the social order"—was dressed in the robes of a bishop and gave quasi-ecclesiastic sermons, on various feast days such as the Feat of Fools and that of Asses. Feast days such as these were specifically intended to mock the church—in the case of the Feast of Fools, for a period of four days—both by its practices and rituals and its hierarchy, and in doing so celebrate the disfranchised. Likewise ecclesiastical parodies were favoured for their societies (such as the Abbey of Cokaygne). They were an early expression of what became known later, in France, as Sociétés Joyeuses, also known as an "Abbey of Misrule"—particularly, comments the historian Katja Gvozdeva, with its emphasis on "carnivalesque rituals". Such activities were already known of in Exeter in 1333, for example, Grandisson had warned his own vicars, against making what he termed  ("obscene remarks") and involved the wearing of masks and hiding one's identity. Although little is known of such groups, the historian Lawrence M. Clopper, suggests that while often these may have constituted innocent May games, "there seems to have been another game, shared by the young clerici and lay people, that involved tormentors in tattered garments", emulating ecclesiastical robes, playing "'somergames' within sacred precincts". One of these summergames, for example, seems to have involved the capture and tormenting of Christ, Peter and Andrew, in which their tormentors receive rewards.

Riotousness in Exeter

The Brothelynham gang comprised, as were English monasteries during the period, solely of men. On repeated, regular occasions throughout 1348 the gang disturbed the peace of the city with assaults and riots. On 11 June that year John Grandisson, the Bishop of Exeter, writing from Chudleigh, instructed his chief agents in Exeter—the dean, the archdeacon, and the rector of Exeter Cathedral—to investigate the order and its members, whom he referred to as "malign men". The bishop instructed his men to condemn the order the following Sunday by means of proclamations in Exeter Cathedral and all the other churches and chapels of the city. They were to emphasise that those who disobeyed, and failed to publically withdraw from the fraternity, would not only be excommunicated but met with physical force, as the bishop could—and stated his intention to—call upon the assistance of the city militia. Grandisson believed that their "order, or rather error", as he phrased it, were comparable to "thorns and thistles" growing in the field of religion, which needed to be cut away so as to prevent the Church being "marred or disordered".

The leader of the Order—whom the members idolised as a so-called abbot—was claimed to be a known "lunatic and raver", or in Grandison's own words, "" ("someone of lunacy and delirium"). The linguist Derek Baker translated this as "a certain crazy lunatic". Having been crowned with a bishop's mitre, he was enthroned and carried around on a mock-episcopal chair. His followers, in a similar vein, wore monks' habits and used horns to fanfare their abbot, who ruled them as from a theatrical stage, an imitation of the bishop's dais. The horn, likewise, was intended to unfavourably contrast with holy bells. However, the bishop's use of the word theatre—theatrum—needs analysis, says the historian R. P. Chope, as Exeter possessed no such building in this period; the evidence is made more scarce as we have none from the Order's creators, only its proponents. The Brothelyngham monks paraded their abbot around the streets of Exeter on something akin to a litter, and, with their abbot enthroned above them, they proceeded to beat up and rob such citizens as they encountered. The medievalist Derek Brewer has argued that, to modern historians and commentators, "such sport is as much folklore as drama", but the members of the order seem to have considered themselves actors rather than villains. To the Church, though, they were a criminal gang who—expanding their operations from the city—invaded local towns and villages, where, says Chambers, they "beset in a great company the streets and places", many of them on horse. They then extorted money from the inhabitants when they met them. They also kidnapped many people, both the religious and laity, from whom they would demand ransoms. Grandisson suggests they robbed from each others' houses when the opportunity presented itself.

Grandisson noted that, although the gang called this ludus,—"under colour and veil of a game, or rather a farce", he says—simply, "it was sheer rapine". The church had waged a campaign against theatrical ludi ever since Pope Innocent III's condemnation of "ludi theatricales" in 1207, which he described as encouraging  ("games, madness [and] obscene debauchery"). They may well have been debauched in their behaviour, suggests Gvozdeva, and a contemporary record describes them as "a pestilent sect, guilty of great excesses" in the city. Regardless of any attempt at theatrical lightheartedness they may have tried to present, comments Grandisson, "though they seem to do this under colour and cloak of play, or rather of buffoonery, yet this is beyond doubt no other than theft and rapine, since the money is taken from the unwilling".  They were certainly disobedient, and either of which would be sufficient to ensure the bishop's ire. They appear not to have heeded the bishop's edicts, for he subsequently excommunicated the order, calling the men "a threat to religion, the King and the Church": "not least", comments Luxford, "to the monks of Cowick and St Nicholas's and the nuns of Polsloe". The Bishop saw the men's actions, not merely as those of mortal men whom he could shepherd through the valley, but as active harbingers of the Lord of Light, who is "busy to spread the poison of his iniquity more widely in those places where he seeth most hope of mischief", but imperilling both their own sould sand those, such as the tanners and leathermen, who fought back.

Name
Although the order claimed to be "of Brothelyngham", this was a fiction—there was no such place. However, the name was not without implication and would have had meaning to contemporaries. They would have understood the word to have meant brethelyng, brethel or brothel, meaning 'good for nothing', 'chaotic' 'wretched' or 'foul', rather than a bawdy house. The Victorian antiquary Francis Charles Hingeston-Randolph, who edited Gradisson's Registrum, suggested that it is possible that the title was bestowed upon the gang by the bishop himself, in his indignation that people so worthless would "guilty laugh Holy Religion", as he put it. Hingeston-Randolph also understood the Brothelynghamites to be more in the manner of a dissenting sect of the Church than a criminal gang. He commented, "I must confess that I cannot understand this. There was no such Order, and I believe that there was no such place". The name Brothelyngham was probably a satirical nod towards Sempringham Priory, which in the Middle Ages was also known humorously as Simplingham. The scholar Ian Mortimer suggests that the Premonstratensian monastery of Sempringham was an obvious target for popular satire, as it was the only abbey in the country which housed both monks and nuns under the same roof: "sniggering in some secular quarters [was] inevitable".

Later events
In 1351, in a similar outbreak of anti-clerical fake monasticism in the area, another group of pseudo-monks—describing themselves as an "Order of hermits"—occurred in Townstal. The men "claimed power by a special papal privilege to hear confession and offer the sacraments" without Grandisson's permission, or, indeed, any theological training whatsoever. Exeter and its theatre would seem to have been a focus for sociopathic behaviour, and in 1353 Grandisson issued an order to close down a performance called Ludum Noxium, a satire against the city's cloth-dressing (textile finishing) industry, which was causing disturbance. Performed by their rivals the leather sellers, Grandisson condemned their play as being composed "in contumely and approbrium" (i.e., in insulting language and showing scornful contempt).

Historiography
The Order of Brothelyngham ha sbeen known of since the 19th-century antiquarian, Francis Charles Hingeston-Randolph, first edited Bishop Grandisson's registers in 1885, publishing them 2-years later. Hingeston-Randolph was, however, unsure what, in the Bishop's plaint, he had encountered, and wrote in a footnote that:

Hingeston-Randolph's own view was that the Bishop had given the group its name, also out of uncertainty as to what they constituted, while ensuring his language made it clear that group should be stigmatized by Christians.

he historiographical significance for modern historians, says Gvozdeva, is not that the gang wanted to be proper monks, have an abbot or be part of a mendicant order, but that they took upon themselves the appearance and, in their eyes, the attitudes of one. The medievalist Julian Luxford has described it illustrating the extent of ill-feeling felt by the general population towards the perceived "abbatial greed and luxurious living" they suspected the religeuse of commonly indulging in against their Rule. Luxford has argued that for the modern historian, the significance of the order is what their own expressed beliefs reveal of their own—and likely more general—views of the priesthood: that, for example, "monks and nuns blindly followed leaders, were idolatrous, avaricious, even luxurious (thus 'Brothelyngham’)". "The insinuation of this satire about grasping abbots", says the historian Martin Heale, "is hard to mistake". In her study of French late-medieval theatre, Gvozdeva has suggested that the Order of Brothelyngham "demonstrates particularly well the ambiguous relationship between the play, ritual and theatre", noting the theatrical nature of the order's activities: the members celebrate the investiture of their abbot with horns, it takes place takes place on trestles (in theatro) and his character is clearly intended to be a burlesque.

Notes

References

Bibliography

External links 

History of Exeter
1348 establishments in England
Anti-clericalism